Janet Buckner is an American politician and a Democratic member of the Colorado Senate who represents District 29, which includes a part of Aurora in Arapahoe County. During the 2020 reapportionment process, Buckner's residence moved from senate district 28 to senate district 29. Earlier, she represented District 28 from January 2021 to January 2023. Before her state senate tenure, she was a member of the Colorado House of Representatives. She represented District 40, which covered a portion of Arapahoe County, from July 15, 2015, to January 13, 2021.

Career 
Buckner was appointed to her house seat in 2015 to replace her husband John Buckner after his death in office; she kept the seat in the 2016 elections. She was a professional speech and language therapist until her retirement in 2007.

In the state house, Buckner served as the vice chair of the House Education Committee and also served on the House Health, Insurance, & Environment Committee.

After her appointment to her House seat in 2015, Buckner was elected to keep her seat in 2016, winning with 57.69% of the vote against Republican opponent Todd Brophy. During the 2018-2020 session, Buckner served as the Speaker pro Tempore of the House of Representatives

References

External links
Official campaign website

21st-century African-American women
21st-century African-American politicians
21st-century American politicians
21st-century American women politicians
Democratic Party Colorado state senators
African-American state legislators in Colorado
Ball State University alumni
Living people
Democratic Party members of the Colorado House of Representatives
People from Aurora, Colorado
Women state legislators in Colorado
Year of birth missing (living people)
Spouses of Colorado politicians